Nathan Brett Woolfe (born 6 October 1988) is an English footballer who plays as a forward for Cymru North club Airbus UK Broughton.

Career

Bolton Wanderers
Born in Manchester, Greater Manchester, Woolfe started his career at Bolton Wanderers, where he played up-front as a striker. He made his Bolton debut on 13 March 2008, at the Estádio José Alvalade against Sporting CP in the second leg match of the last 16 of the 2007–08 UEFA Cup, replacing Heiðar Helguson for the final 14 minutes of a 1–0 loss (2–1 aggregate).

On 13 November 2008, he joined Conference National club Wrexham on an initial one-month loan deal. Two days later, he was given his debut by Dean Saunders away to Weymouth, scoring a 20-yard free kick to open a 3–1 win. Woolfe was released by Bolton in June 2009, along with Blerim Džemaili, Robert Sissons and James Sinclair.

Jerez Industrial / Non-league
A month after his Bolton release, he had a trial with Rochdale and took part in a number of their friendlies in the buildup to the new season. In October, he joined the Glenn Hoddle Academy in Spain after being granted a scholarship. He went on loan to Jerez Industrial CF in Segunda División B and played nine games, scoring two goals. In August 2010, he went on trial to UD Almería B in the same league.

In March 2011 he joined Northwich Victoria. He played a key role for the Vics as they finished 2nd in the league and reached the quarter-finals of the FA Trophy. However, due to financial problems Vics were relegated. It was announced that Woolfe had joined Hednesford Town on 18 July 2012. In his first season they were promoted and he scored 11 goals. In May 2014 he agreed to join Stockport County, also of the Conference North.

Wales
Woolfe went on to sign for Connah's Quay Nomads of the Welsh Premier League in January 2016. On 29 June 2017, he scored the only goal of a shock home win over HJK Helsinki in the Europa League first qualifying round first leg, though the Deesiders lost 3–1 on aggregate. He was part of their side that won the Welsh Cup in 2017–18; as a substitute on 7 April, he scored the last goal of a 6–1 win over Bangor City in the semi-finals.

On 31 January 2019, Woolfe was loaned out to neighbours Airbus UK Broughton of the Cymru Alliance until the end of the season. Just over a year later, he returned to the Wingmakers, now in the Cymru Premier, on a permanent basis.

Personal life
His older half-brother is Steven Woolfe, a lawyer who was Member of the European Parliament for the UK Independence Party representing North West England from 2014 to 2019.

References

External links
 
 

1988 births
Living people
Footballers from Manchester
English footballers
English expatriate footballers
Association football forwards
Bolton Wanderers F.C. players
Wrexham A.F.C. players
Jerez Industrial CF players
Northwich Victoria F.C. players
Hednesford Town F.C. players
National League (English football) players
Segunda División B players
Expatriate footballers in Spain
Stockport County F.C. players
Connah's Quay Nomads F.C. players
Airbus UK Broughton F.C. players
Cymru Premier players
English expatriate sportspeople in Spain